Barrow Island may refer to:
 Barrow Island (Western Australia), Australia
 Barrow Island (Queensland), Australia
 Barrow Island, Barrow-in-Furness, England